David Mrůzek is a Czech slalom canoeist who competed in the 1990s and 2000s.

He won a gold medal in the C-2 team event at the 2007 ICF Canoe Slalom World Championships in Foz do Iguaçu. He also won a gold and a silver in the same event at the European Championships.

References
Overview of athlete's results at canoeslalom.net

Czech male canoeists
Living people
Year of birth missing (living people)
Medalists at the ICF Canoe Slalom World Championships